Majbritt Toft Hansen (born 27 April 1993) is a Danish handball player for Viborg HK and the Danish national team.

Career
Toft Hansen began her senior career at Skive fH before moving to SK Aarhus, later Aarhus United. In 2019 she signed a two-year contract with league rivals Viborg HK.

Like her three brothers Toft Hansen plays the pivot position.

She represented Denmark at the 2020 European Women's Handball Championship.

References

1993 births
Living people
People from Skive Municipality
Danish female handball players
Sportspeople from the Central Denmark Region
21st-century Danish women